Stockholm is a town in Aroostook County, Maine, United States. The population was 250 at the 2020 census.

History

Starting in 1870, a Swedish-immigrant colony was established by the State of Maine in Aroostook County. The State of Maine had appointed William W. Thomas Jr., who had served as American Consul in Sweden during the administration of President Abraham Lincoln, to be State Immigration Commissioner. On March 23, 1870, the Legislature passed an Act authorizing a Board of Immigration and Beverly A. Benson was named Commissioner of Immigration. Benson went to Sweden, recruited immigrants and led them first into New Sweden township followed by the townships of Westmanland in 1879 and Stockholm in 1881.

In the late 19th and early 20th centuries, French and Swedish were the primary languages of many families living and working in Stockholm. Many French-speaking Acadians migrated to Stockholm to work in the three wood mills Stockholm had at the time.

The Anderson Brothers Store is listed on the National Register of Historic Places.

Geography

Demographics

2010 census
As of the census of 2010, there were 253 people, 110 households, and 75 families living in the town. The racial makeup of the town was 98.4% White, 0.4% Asian, and 1.2% from two or more races.

There were 110 households, of which 22.7% had children under the age of 18 living with them, 53.6% were married couples living together, 6.4% had a female householder with no husband present, 8.2% had a male householder with no wife present, and 31.8% were non-families. 29.1% of all households were made up of individuals, and 13.6% had someone living alone who was 65 years of age or older. The average household size was 2.30 and the average family size was 2.75.

The median age in the town was 46.7 years. 16.2% of residents were under the age of 18; 8.3% were between the ages of 18 and 24; 21.7% were from 25 to 44; 33.6% were from 45 to 64; and 20.2% were 65 years of age or older. The gender makeup of the town was 48.6% male and 51.4% female.

2000 census
As of the census of 2000, there were 271 people, 111 households, and 79 families living in the town.  The population density was 7.8 people per square mile (3.0/km).  There were 140 housing units at an average density of 4.0 per square mile (1.6/km).  The racial makeup of the town was 99.26% White, 0.37% Native American, and 0.37% from two or more races.

There were 111 households, out of which 29.7% had children under the age of 18 living with them, 60.4% were married couples living together, 7.2% had a female householder with no husband present, and 28.8% were non-families. 26.1% of all households were made up of individuals, and 18.0% had someone living alone who was 65 years of age or older.  The average household size was 2.44 and the average family size was 2.94.

In the town, the population was spread out, with 23.2% under the age of 18, 4.8% from 18 to 24, 24.0% from 25 to 44, 26.6% from 45 to 64, and 21.4% who were 65 years of age or older.  The median age was 44 years. For every 100 females, there were 108.5 males.  For every 100 females age 18 and over, there were 112.2 males.

The median income for a household in the town was $31,563, and the median income for a family was $36,750. Males had a median income of $25,357 versus $23,958 for females. The per capita income for the town was $15,246.  About 8.4% of families and 8.5% of the population were below the poverty line, including 12.5% of those under the age of eighteen and 3.6% of those 65 or over.

References

Other sources

Lenentine, Charlotte  The Swedish People of Northern Maine (University of Maine. 1950)
Hede, Richard   Maine's Swedish Colony 1870–1970 Centennial Book (1970)

External links
Town of Stockholm
Maine's Swedish Colony

Swedish-American culture in Maine
Towns in Aroostook County, Maine
Populated places established in 1881
Towns in Maine
1881 establishments in Maine